The 7th Infantry Regiment (Estonian: 7. Jalaväerügement), was one of the two fast deployment border-covering Estonian regiments created during the Estonian War of Independence, which lasted till the Soviet occupation of Estonia. The main task of these regiments was to delay the invading forces on the borders in order to win more time for the mobilization to be carried out.

History
The 7th Infantry Regiment staff was based in Võru and Petseri. The unit was made up by mainly active duty soldiers and officers.

Order of battle
The 7th Infantry Regiment peacetime strength was a total 1714 soldiers and 80 horses. The unit order of battle in 1939:
Staff of the Regiment
Signal Company
Engineering Company
Ski-Bicycle Company
Cavalry Company
Building Company
Ambulance
1st Infantry Battalion
2nd Infantry Battalion
3rd Infantry Battalion

References

7. jalaväe polk 18. XII 1918.-18. XII 1928. a. Rügemendi 10. aastapäeva puhul // Sõdur, 1928, nr 51/52.
 7. jalaväerügemendi rinnamärk

Regiments of Estonia
Infantry regiments
Military units and formations established in 1918
1918 establishments in Estonia
Estonian War of Independence